"Moneytalks" is a song written by Malcolm and Angus Young and produced by Bruce Fairbairn for the hard rock band AC/DC. Originally released on 21 September 1990 on the album The Razors Edge, it was later released as a single in December later that year. A live version of the song recorded on the band's 1990–1991 Razors Edge World Tour appeared on AC/DC's 1992 live album, Live.

The song is one of AC/DC's biggest hits, breaking the top 40 on the Billboard Hot 100, (becoming the band's 1st top 40 hit on the Hot 100 since Back in Black in 1981) the UK Singles Charts, and the Australian ARIA Singles Chart. It is the band's highest charting single to date in the United States, peaking at #23. During their subsequent world tour, thousands of "Angus Bucks" were dropped on the audience during the song. A music video of the song, directed by David Mallet, was also released, featuring a live performance during the tour. Despite its popularity, it has not been performed in concert by the band since the tour.

Personnel 
 Brian Johnson – lead vocals
 Angus Young – lead guitar
 Malcolm Young – rhythm guitar, backing vocals
 Cliff Williams – bass guitar, backing vocals
 Chris Slade – drums

Charts

Weekly charts

Year-end charts

References

1990 singles
1990 songs
AC/DC songs
Atco Records singles
Music videos directed by David Mallet (director)
Song recordings produced by Bruce Fairbairn
Songs written by Angus Young
Songs written by Malcolm Young